Open string may refer to:

 Open string (music), a fundamental note of a stringed instrument
 Open string (physics), a string with endpoints in string theory